The 1986 Derbyshire West by-election was held on 8 May 1986 when the sitting Conservative Party Member of Parliament, Matthew Parris, took the Chiltern Hundreds and resigned, in order to become the presenter of Weekend World for ITV.

The election was held on the same day as the 1986 local elections and the Ryedale by-election.

During the campaign, the seat's former MP, Matthew Parris, told Vincent Hanna on Newsnight that he thought Labour could gain the seat from the Conservatives.

In his memoirs, he admitted that he deliberately misled both Hanna and the audience to prevent a Liberal victory.
'had I not lied in an interview with the late Vincent Hanna, a BBC pollster carrying out a poll which most improbably suggested that Labour and not the Liberal Democrats[sic] were the challengers in this by-election, [the Liberals] would have won. I knew what I said was false.

Despite a large swing away from him, 28-year-old Patrick McLoughlin of the Conservative Party (who went on to serve in The Cabinet from 2010 to 2018) beat the Liberal Party candidate by 100 votes, and he remained the MP for the seat until his retirement in 2019.

See also
1891 West Derbyshire by-election
1900 West Derbyshire by-election
1967 West Derbyshire by-election

References

1986 elections in the United Kingdom
1986 in England
May 1986 events in the United Kingdom
By-elections to the Parliament of the United Kingdom in Derbyshire constituencies
1980s in Derbyshire